Mark William Robertson (born 6 April 1977 in Sydney) is an Australian former soccer player.

Club career
In December 2007, Robertson signed with Sydney FC as cover for Adam Casey, out with a long-term injury.

Personal life
Robertson's son Alexander, who was born in Scotland whilst he played for Dundee, currently plays for Manchester City and England U17s.

Career statistics

International

References

External links
 
 Aussie Footballers Robertson to Rooney 
 Mark's soccer coaching academy
 Stats for Sydney United in 2008
 Sydney United 2009 player roster

1977 births
Living people
Sportsmen from New South Wales
Australian expatriate soccer players
Australian expatriate sportspeople in England
Australia international soccer players
National Soccer League (Australia) players
A-League Men players
Scottish Premier League players
Burnley F.C. players
Dundee F.C. players
Marconi Stallions FC players
Perth Glory FC players
St Johnstone F.C. players
Stockport County F.C. players
Swindon Town F.C. players
Sydney FC players
Sydney United 58 FC players
Wollongong Wolves FC players
Expatriate footballers in England
Expatriate footballers in Scotland
Soccer players from Sydney
Association football midfielders
Australian soccer players